Keanu Gregory Cupido (born 15 January 1998) is a South African soccer player who plays as a defender for Cape Town City in the ABSA Premiership.

Career

International
Cupido made his senior international debut on 4 June 2019, playing the entirety of South Africa's victory 4-2 via penalties over Uganda at the 2019 COSAFA Cup.

Career statistics

International

References

External links

Cape Town City F.C. (2016) players
South African Premier Division players
South African soccer players
South Africa international soccer players
Association football defenders
South African expatriate soccer players
South African expatriates in France
1998 births
Living people